Benz is a surname. Notable people with the surname include:
Diana Bendz, American polymer scientist and environmental and industrial engineer
Jacob Christian Bendz (1802–1858), Danish medical doctor, military surgeon, and titular professor
Sergei Bendz (born 1983), Russian footballer
Wilhelm Bendz (1804–1832), Danish painter

See also
Benz (disambiguation)